Alexandru Potocean (born 26 April 1984) is a Romanian film actor. He has appeared in more than fifteen films since 2005.

Selected filmography

References

External links
 

1984 births
Living people
Actors from Timișoara
Romanian male film actors
21st-century Romanian male actors